Perfect Game is a 2011 South Korean film based on the true story of rivals Sun Dong-yeol of the Haitai Tigers and Choi Dong-won of the Lotte Giants, the top pitchers in the Korea Baseball Organization league during the 1980s. The rivalry between the two was further heated up by regionalism at the time with Sun representing the Jeolla Province and Choi, the Gyeongsang Province.

The sports movie revisits one of the most exciting matches in Korean baseball history on May 16, 1987, which would be the last time the two stars would face each other, and ended in a 15-inning draw, although neither actually pitched a perfect game. It stars Cho Seung-woo as Choi and Yang Dong-geun as Sun.

Cast
Cho Seung-woo - Choi Dong-won
Yang Dong-geun - Sun Dong-yeol
Choi Jung-won - Sports writer Seo-hyung
Juni - Min-kyung
Cho Jin-woong - Kim Yong-chul 
Ma Dong-seok - Park Man-soo 
Lee Do-kyeong - Coach Sung Ki-young 
Lee Hae-woo - Kang Hyun-soo 
Jo Chan-hyung - Han Moon-yeon 
Son Byong-ho - Kim Eung-ryong
Kim Young-min - Kang Sung-tae
Lee Seon-jin - Man-soo's wife
Kong Jeong-hwan - Yoo Doo-yeol
Cha Hyeon-woo - Jang Chae-geun
Kim Dong-hee - Jung Young-ki
Park Seo-joon - Chil-goo
Dan Asenlund - Canadian play-by-play commentator
Lasse Lindh - Canadian color commentator
Choi Il-hwa - Hyun-soo's father (cameo)
Kim Byeong-ok - Chief secretary (cameo)
Lee Byung-joon - Department head Choi (cameo)
Oh Jung-se - Sports commentator (cameo)
Choi Won-young - Sportscaster (cameo)
Jang Kyeong-ah - Reporter (cameo)
Go Se-won - Jae-suk (cameo)
Yeo Ho-min - (cameo)
Lee Si-eon - Member of the national team / MBC Baseball player (cameo)
Song Sam-dong - Senior (cameo)
 Tae In-ho.

See also 
 Baseball in South Korea
 Glove (film)
 YMCA Baseball Team

References

External links 
  
 
 
 

2011 films
2011 biographical drama films
2010s sports drama films
South Korean biographical drama films
Biographical films about sportspeople
Cultural depictions of South Korean men
Cultural depictions of baseball players
South Korean baseball films
Lotte Entertainment films
2010s Korean-language films
Films directed by Park Hee-gon
2011 drama films
2010s South Korean films